Bhadreswar  is a city and a municipality of Hooghly district in the Indian state of West Bengal. It is a part of the area covered by Kolkata Metropolitan Development Authority (KMDA).

Geography

Location
It has an average elevation of 2 metres (6 feet). It is situated by the Hooghly River. It is one of the beautiful places in Hooghly district.

Police station
Bhadreswar police station has jurisdiction over Bhadreswar and Champdani Municipal areas and parts of Singur CD Block.

Urbanisation
In Chandannagore subdivision 58.52% of the population is rural and the urban population is 41.48%. Chandannagore subdivision has 1 municipal corporation, 3 municipalities and 7 census towns. The single municipal corporation is Chandernagore Municipal Corporation. The municipalities are Tarakeswar Municipality, Bhadreswar Municipality and Champdany Municipality. Of the three CD Blocks in Chandannagore subdivision, Tarakeswar CD Block is wholly rural, Haripal CD Block is predominantly rural with just 1 census town, and Singur CD Block is slightly less rural with 6 census towns. Polba Dadpur and Dhaniakhali CD Blocks of Chinsurah subdivision (included in the map alongside) are wholly rural. The municipal areas are industrialised. All places marked in the map are linked in the larger full screen map.

Demographics

Population
As per 2011 Census of India Bhadreswar had a total population of 101,477 of which 53,330 (53%) were males and 48,147 (47%) were females. Population below 6 years was 9,580. The total number of literates in Bhadreswar was 79,498 (86.51% of the population over 6 years).

 India census, Bhadreswar had a population of 105,944. Males constitute 55% of the population and females 45%. Bhadreswar has an average literacy rate of 74%, higher than the national average of 59.5%; with 59% of the males and 41% of the females literate. 10% of the population is under 6 years of age. It is the home to Ashish kumar Sarkar, a retired eminent engineer in Babughat , Nimtala

Migrants
Jute mills drew in a large labour force from the neighbouring states of Bihar and Orissa, as well as eastern Uttar Pradesh, quite often forming an overwhelming majority of the population in the area, living in shanty towns and bustees dotting the mill area.  The proportion of migrants in the population was 80% in Bhadreswar.

According to a study carried out by Vidyasagar University, "Most of these industrial units were located in riverine towns. A few of these were old towns inhabited previously by middle class Bengali 'babus' while others were new towns grown out of agricultural lands... Agriculture in Bengal was more remunerative than work in the jute mills but what the jute mills paid was enough to attract labour from Bihar, Orissa, U.P. first and then from C.P. or even Madras...The industrial 'mohallas' remained as 'ghettos'. There was little or no interconnection or social and cultural contact between local Bengali population and the mill hands. Both lived in their own worlds."

Kolkata Urban Agglomeration
The following Municipalities and Census Towns in Hooghly district were part of Kolkata Urban Agglomeration in 2011 census: Bansberia (M), Hugli-Chinsurah (M), Bara Khejuria (Out Growth), Shankhanagar (CT), Amodghata (CT), Chak Bansberia (CT), Naldanga (CT), Kodalia (CT), Kulihanda (CT),  Simla (CT), Dharmapur (CT), Bhadreswar (M), Champdani (M), Chandannagar (M Corp.), Baidyabati (M), Serampore (M), Rishra (M), Rishra (CT), Bamunari (CT), Dakshin Rajyadharpur (CT), Nabagram Colony (CT), Konnagar (M), Uttarpara Kotrung (M), Raghunathpur (PS-Dankuni) (CT), Kanaipur (CT) and Keota (CT).

Economy

Industry
Victoria Jute Mills at Telenipara, Bhadreswar was established in 1885 and employs about 5,000 people. The mill is passing through a rough phase, closing down and opening off and on with militant labour in a volatile environment.

Transport

State Highway 6 (West Bengal)/ Grand Trunk Road passes through Bhadreswar. Private Bus number 2 (Chunchura Court - Dakshineswar) plies through here.

Bhadreswar railway station is on the Howrah-Bardhaman main line. It is part of Kolkata Suburban Railway system.

Education

Kabi Sukanta Mahavidyalaya, a general degree college, was established at Bhadreswar in 1986. Bhadreswar has multiple high-schools within town limits, the most prominent being Telinipara Bhadreswar High School which is one of the oldest school in Hooghly district and Digra Mallickhati Deshbandhu Vidyapith and Prominent girl's schools in the area include Saradapally Kanya Vidyapith and Dharmatala Girls High School.

Pearl Rosary School is the most renowned school in the locality. The school is affiliated to WBBSE and WBCHSE. The school is an authorised study centre of National Institute of Open Schooling (NIOS), Govt of India.

Recently, private schools have also started increasing in number and student capacity in the town, with Durgamoyee Academy opening one more branch near Bhadreswar Station.

Tourist Spot
1. The Banabithi Park located near the DVC channel, in Natunpara, Bhardeswar.
2. Bhadreswar Nath Temple located near Bhadreswar G.T. Road.
3. Bhadreswar Ganga River Ghat.
4. Charcikatala in Bighati is a Holy spot, famous for the local deity.

References

External links
 Bhadreswar information

Cities and towns in Hooghly district
Neighbourhoods in Kolkata
Kolkata Metropolitan Area
Cities in West Bengal